David C. Poindexter (December 21, 1891 – March 15, 1927) was a North Dakota public servant and politician with the Republican Party who served as the North Dakota State Auditor from 1921 to 1924. He was defeated in the 1924 Republican Primary and therefore did not run again for the office. He died at the age of 35 in Bismarck, North Dakota.

Notes

1891 births
1927 deaths
North Dakota State Auditors
20th-century American politicians